Knol or KNOL may refer to:

 Knol, a reference site by Google
 KNOL (FM), a radio station (107.5 FM) licensed to serve Jean Lafitte, Louisiana, United States
 KNOL, NASDAQ ticker code for Knology

People
As a given name
Knol Tate, American musician

As a family name
Ankie Broekers-Knol (born 1946), Dutch politician, president of the Dutch Senate
Monique Knol (born 1964), Dutch cyclist
Ruud Knol (born 1981), Dutch football player
Tim Knol (born 1989), Dutch singer-songwriter
Enzo Knol (born 1993), Dutch video blogger

See also 
 Knoll (disambiguation)

Dutch-language surnames